Jack Woodbridge (born 1956) is an American-born pianist, singer and composer from Scranton, Pennsylvania. Woodbridge is known for his collaborations with independent film director Flavio Alves and  award-winning guitarist/ producer Dean Bailin as well as for his theatrical scores and two albums, Picture This and Jack of Hearts.

Early life
Woodbridge was born and raised in the West Side neighborhood of Scranton, Pennsylvania. He is the son of John (deceased) and Joan Kenney Woodbridge and is a 1974 graduate of West Scranton High School. He discovered his love for music at an early age and began playing the piano at age eight. He wrote his first song, "Debbie Dear," at age 12 and began singing professionally following his graduation from high school.

Woodbridge graduated with a B.A. in Advertising from Pennsylvania State University in 1978. He self-designed his curriculum to include an emphasis on Music, Graphic Arts, Film and Photography. He has been a member of ASCAP (American Society of Composers, Authors and Publishers) since 1996.

Career 
Woodbridge has worked for many years as a keyboardist and vocalist for several bands in Northeastern Pennsylvania; including OFAY (1974), The Stones Show and W.A.M.M.  As a solo pianist, he has focused on the Great American Songbook, contemporary standards and his own original compositions. 
He has performed at various clubs, restaurants and private events throughout the world. As the event pianist for Merrill Lynch, he performed at the Plaza, Waldorf and Ritz hotels in New York City. He continues to perform live throughout Manhattan and Northeast Pennsylvania.

Composer 
Woodbridge has lived in New York City since 1985. With the encouragement and support of Tony Martell of CBS Records, he began to compose as a freelance writer for the label’s publishing division, CBSongs.  As a composer, Woodbridge has scored the music to several films; including “Even in My Dreams," The Secret Friend and Tom in America, all directed by Flavio Alves. He has also scored the off-Broadway show, "The Tale of Tyler T" and a musical revue concept called "Vampire Blues", as well as a rock opera, "The Great Northeast", that was recorded and aired on public radio in 1991. "The Great Northeast" was recorded and produced by George Graham. Woodbridge is working on a soundtrack to a theatrical production based on the life of Vincent van Gogh that is scheduled for a production in early 2014. Woodbridge’s original music has been featured on the CNN television network, where he wrote the main themes for various productions, including "Showbiz Today". His music has also been featured as a part of the New York City Marathon and the New York Dance Alliance. His music has been recorded by Babs Winn and the Kicking Boogie Band, Sharon McKnight and Laurie Naughton and he has co-written with two-time Academy Award-winning composer Al Kasha and award-winning lyricist Valerie Ciptak.  Woodbridge has also composed jingles and other promotional music for the Maloney and Fox Agency in New York City; including for General Motors and Microsoft.

Albums and live performances 
Having always loved live performance, Woodbridge returned to the stage in the early 2000s and his shows began to quickly sell out, most notably at Sam’s Cabaret in New York City. This led to his first album, Picture This (2006), a collection of jazz, pop and blues produced and arranged by Dean Bailin.   
Woodbridge’s second album, Jack of Hearts (2010), is considered his most personal work. The music included on the album was inspired from his diagnosis and subsequent recovery from a rare spinal tumor that could have left him paralyzed. Once again produced by Bailin, “Jack of Hearts” reached considerable success, including a sold-out show in Scranton, Pennsylvania, as well as a sold-out encore. The single, "Broken," has received much critical acclaim and has been turned into a major music video for Joe Van Wie Productions.  Completely recovered from his illness, Woodbridge returned to live performing, following a two-year hiatus, in the spring of 2013. His third album, once again produced by Bailin, featuring acclaimed saxophonist "Blue" Lou Marini, is slated for release in 2014.

Discography

Albums
 Picture This (2006)
 Jack of Hearts (2010)

Film Scores
 Even in my Dreams (2008)
 The Secret Friend (2010)
 Tom in America (2013)

Theater
 The Tale of Tyler T (1987)
 Vampire Blues (1991)
 Yellow Heat (1992)
 The Rooms (2013)

Other
 The Great Northeast (1980)
 CNN Television Network (1990-1995)
 Lincoln Center (A Midsummer Night’s Swing, with Babs Winn, 2005)
 Merkin Hall (2006)
 New York Dance Alliance (1994)
 New York City Marathon (annually since 1993)

References

External links 
 
 Allmusic page

1956 births
Living people
Musicians from Scranton, Pennsylvania
Smeal College of Business alumni
American male singers
American male composers
20th-century American composers
20th-century American pianists
American male pianists
21st-century American pianists
20th-century American male musicians
21st-century American male musicians